Rawlence is a surname. Notable people with the surname include:

Ben Rawlence, British writer
John Rawlence (1915–1983), British cricketer

See also
Lawrence (surname)